The Democratic League in Montenegro is an Albanian minority political party in Montenegro.

History
It was one of the key organizers (together with the Liberals) of the 1992 Montenegrin independence referendum. Prior to the 2012 elections Democratic League in Montenegro decided to enter the Albanian Coalition with the Albanian Alternative (AA) and the Democratic Party (DP). The AA and DSCG had contested the 2009 elections as the "Albanian List", winning a single seat. Led by Fatmir Deka, in the 2012 elections the alliance received 1.1% of the vote, winning one seat. In September 2016, the Democratic League in Montenegro and Democratic Party (DP) decided to sign an agreement with Albanian Coalition "Perspective" for 2016 elections, but they fail to win single seat in Parliament.

Elections

Montenegrin parliament

References

Political parties established in 1990
Political parties in Yugoslavia
Albanian political parties in Montenegro
1990s establishments in Montenegro